Jonathan James Cake (born 31 August 1967) is an English actor who has worked on various TV programmes and films. His notable screen roles include Jack Favell in Rebecca (1997), Oswald Mosley in Mosley (1997), Japheth in the NBC television film Noah's Ark (1999), Tyrannus in the ABC miniseries Empire (2005) and Det. Chuck Vance on the ABC drama series Desperate Housewives (2011–2012).

Early life
Cake was born in Worthing, Sussex.  His father was a glassware importer and his mother a school administrator. He is the youngest of three sons. 

When he was four years old, he was invited on stage during a traditional British pantomime for children. This exposure ignited his interest in the performing arts. By the age of eight, Jonathan had taken drama classes and took part in plays. As a teenager, he toured Britain with London's National Youth Theatre. 

After leaving school, Cake studied English at Corpus Christi College, Cambridge. He became a rugby player in college and graduated in 1989. He attended a two-year training programme at the Bristol Old Vic Theatre School, then trained with the Royal Shakespeare Company.

Career
In 1992, Jonathan Cake appeared in William Shakespeare's play As You Like It, a Royal Shakespeare Company production at the Royal Shakespeare Theatre in Stratford-upon-Avon. He also performed the play at the Barbican Theatre in London in 1993. Also that year, he appeared in a Royal Shakespeare Company production of Christopher Marlowe's Tamburlaine the Great. He then appeared with the Royal Shakespeare Company in Wallenstein, The Odyssey and Beggar's Opera.

In 1995, Cake acted in the Shared Experience Theatre Company production of George Eliot's novel The Mill on the Floss at London's Lyric Theatre.  Cake branched out to the screen when he landed a guest spot in the British TV comedy series Press Gang in 1993. He made his first television film appearance alongside Jasper Carrott and Ann Bryson in BBC's Carrott U Like in 1994 and broke into the film business the following year with a small role in the American film First Knight.

After appearing in episodes of Frank Stubbs Promotes and Goodnight Sweetheart, Cake was cast as Gareth in the BBC series Degrees of Error (1995), opposite Beth Goddard, Julian Glover and Phyllida Law. He then played Ewan in two episodes of the series Grange Hill (1996), Nat in two episodes of Cold Lazarus (1996), and Hattersley in the TV miniseries adaptation of Anne Brontë's The Tenant of Wildfell Hall (1996). He was also cast in the TV films Nightlife (1996, with Katrin Cartlidge and Jane Horrocks), The Girl (1996) and the 1996 pilot episode of Wings (a planned remake of the American show of the same title, with Una Stubbs). Also in 1996, Cake was in True Blue, a British sports film based on the book True Blue: The Oxford Boat Race Mutiny by Daniel Topolski and Patrick Robinson, and in an episode of The Thin Blue Line.
 
Cake next worked in Cows (1997), played Jack Favell in the 1997 Anglo-German miniseries Rebecca, based on the 1938 novel of the same name by Daphne du Maurier, and portrayed Peter Templer in a TV miniseries adaptation of Anthony Powell's A Dance to the Music of Time (1997), which starred James Purefoy, Simon Russell Beale and Paul Rhys. He also guest starred in Jonathan Creek (1997). The next year, he starred in Mosley, which was based on the life of British fascist Oswald Mosley. He also portrayed Regan Montana in the TV film Diamond Girl and co-starred with Adrian Dunbar and Susan Vidler in the TV series The Jump (both 1998). The actor closed the decade portraying Japheth in the NBC TV film Noah's Ark (1999). He also worked with Maria Aitken and Leslie Grantham in the British TV film The Bench (1999).
 
In 2000, Cake played Andrew Pryce-Stevens in Honest. He revisited the stage with work in Baby Doll (2000), an adaptation of the film of the same name by Tennessee Williams, and was handed the Barclays Best Actor Award for his performance. The play performed first at the Royal National Theatre and then in London's West End.
 
Cake next appeared as Randolph Cleveland in an episode of Dr. Terrible's House of Horrible (2001), co-starred with Lara Belmont and Teresa Churcher in the television thriller The Swap (2002), starred as Jack Wellington in the short-lived Fox series The American Embassy (2002), and was cast as Andrea in the British film The One and Only (2002). Still in 2002, Cake made his Broadway debut in the leading role of Jason in the Euripides play Medea.
 
Cake appeared in the Canadian television film Riverworld (2003), portrayed Dr. Mengele in the Showtime TV film Out of the Ashes (2003), and portrayed John Christow in the 2004 episode "The Hollow" of Agatha Christie's Poirot. He starred as Jason Shepherd in the film Fallen (2004), appeared as Dr. Malcolm Bowers in an episode of NBC's Inconceivable called "Sex, Lies and Sonograms" (2005), and portrayed Alastair Campbell in the TV film The Government Inspector (2005). He was also cast as a gladiator named Tyrannus in the ABC historical TV series Empire, which ran from 28 June 2005 to 26 July 2005.

Cake played the recurring role of Roy in the ABC short-lived drama series Six Degrees (2006–07). He appeared in an episode of Extras called "Sir Ian McKellen" (2006) and played Marshall Crawford in the TV film The Mastersons of Manhattan (2007). 

On stage, Cake played Father Flynn in John Patrick Shanley's play Doubt (2005) at the Pasadena Playhouse. He then performed in Coriolanus (2006) at London's Shakespeare's Globe, and was cast in Cymbeline (2007) at the Vivian Beaumont Theater in New York City.
 
In 2008, Cake played Rex Mottram in Brideshead Revisited. He had a two episode role in Law & Order: Criminal Intent, alongside his real life wife Julianne Nicholson. The next year, he appeared as Bishop in the ABC TV film Captain Cook's Extraordinary Atlas, starring Jodelle Ferland, Charlie McDermott and Hal Holbrook. He played Cole Barker in two episodes of the NBC series Chuck called "Chuck Versus the Beefcake" and "Chuck Versus the Lethal Weapon". Cake appeared as Marcus Woll in the Law & Order episodes "Boy Gone Astray" and "For the Defense".
 
In 2010, Cake teamed up with Pedro Miguel Arce in the American film Krews, by Hilbert Hakim. The same year, he also played Mark Easterbrook in the TV film Marple: The Pale Horse, starring Julia McKenzie as Miss Marple. Cake is currently appearing as Mark Antony in the Royal Shakespeare Company's latest production of Antony and Cleopatra.  In 2017 he played the Duke in the Theatre for a New Audience production of Measure for Measure

In 2021, Cake had a recurring role on Stargirl as Shade.

Personal life
On 24 September 2004, Cake married American actress Julianne Nicholson in Italy. The couple have two children: a son Ignatius Cake, born September 2007, and a daughter, Phoebe Margaret Cake, born 30 April 2009. Cake was previously engaged to British actress Olivia Williams; the relationship ended after seven years.

Filmography

References

External links
 
 jonathancakefansite

1967 births
Living people
20th-century English male actors
21st-century English male actors
English male film actors
English male television actors
People from Worthing
Male actors from Sussex
Alumni of Corpus Christi College, Cambridge
National Youth Theatre members
Theatre World Award winners